Olle Eriksson Ek (born 22 June 1999) is a Swedish professional ice hockey goaltender playing for the San Diego Gulls of the American Hockey League, within the Anaheim Ducks organization. He was drafted 153rd overall by Anaheim in the 2017 NHL Entry Draft. Eriksson Ek is the son of former hockey player Clas Eriksson and the younger brother of Joel Eriksson Ek, a centre for the Minnesota Wild.

References

External links
 

Swedish ice hockey goaltenders
Anaheim Ducks draft picks
1999 births
Living people